Jorge Blanco Güereña (born December 19, 1991) is a Mexican musician, singer, dancer and actor, best known for portraying Leon Vargas on the Disney Channel television series Violetta.

Early life 
Blanco was born on December 19, 1991 in Guadalajara, Mexico.

Career

2007–2008: Beginnings with High School Musical 
Blanco began his television career in 2007 when he participated in the reality show High School Musical: La Selección which allowed him to participate in a spin-off movie of the successful U.S. High School Musical. Despite not winning the program, Blanco gave his voice to the album of the program, took part in the movie High School Musical: El Desafío Mexico playing the character of Jorge and participated in the tour promoting the movie and the program between 2007 and 2008. In the film, Blanco played the best friend of the protagonist Cristóbal Rodríguez (Cristobal Orellana), which was published in 2008 in Mexico and the following year in Italy.

2011–2015: Cuando toca la campana and success with Violetta 

In 2011, Blanco appeared in the tenth episode of the miniseries Highway: Rodando la Aventura and he was also one of the protagonists of the first season of the television series Cuando toca la campana in which he shot several music videos as "Es el momento" or "A Celebrar". In May of that same year, Blanco traveled to the U.S. to participate in the Disney's Friends for Change Games in the yellow team to help the agency UNICEF, he represents, hereinafter to Mexico in the music video by Bridgit Mendler "We Can Change the World" of the project Disney's Friends for Change.

In 2012, Blanco was cast in the Argentine Disney Channel telenovela Violetta as León, the love interest of Violetta. Due to the filming of Violetta, Blanco participated in only four episodes of the second season of Cuando toca la campana. From 2012 to 2015, Blanco gave his voice to the show's soundtracks and also participated in the concert tours promoting the show.

2016–2020: Musical solo debut and Conmigo 
In February 2016, Blanco announced on his YouTube channel that he signed a recording deal with the Hollywood Records to release his own solo material. On April 22, 2016, Blanco released the music video for his solo song, "Light Your Heart", that is featured on the debut album of Argentine singer and Violetta co-star, Tini, Tini (Martina Stoessel), which is also the soundtrack for the movie Tini: The Movie, which Blanco starred alongside Tini.

On October 12, 2016, Blanco performed the song "Beautiful Mistake" on One Nación. The song was planned to be released as Blanco's debut single in December that year, but these plans never materialized. Blanco's debut single "Risky Business" was released on March 17, 2017. The music video for the song premiered on April 14, 2017. The song "Summer Soul" was released on May 19, 2017 as the follow-up second single. The music video for the song premiered on May 25, 2017. The collaboration between Blanco and fellow artist Saak titled "Una Noche" was released on August 18, 2017. The music video for "Una Noche" premiered on August 31, 2017. From September till October 2017, Blanco opened the European concerts of R5's New Addictions Tour. Blanco was featured on "Gone Is the Night" by Kris Kross Amsterdam, released on November 24, 2017. Blanco's debut extended play titled Conmigo was released on February 14, 2019. On July 20, 2018, Blanco released the original Spanish-language song titled "Si Te Tuviera" as the lead single from the album. On August 17, 2018, Blanco released "Escondida" as the second single from the album. On September 7, 2018, Blanco released "Opciones" as the third single from the album. In September 2018, Blanco opened Sebastián Yatra's concerts in several cities of Mexico. On October 26, 2018, Blanco released "Te La Dedico" as the fourth single from the album. On January 18, 2019, Blanco released the title track "Conmigo" as the fifth single from the album. Blanco performed the songs from the album at an acoustic showcase on the day of the album's release. On May 9, 2019, Blanco began his first solo concert tour, Conmigo Tour.

On May 31, 2019, Blanco released a song titled "Vamos" as a single. On August 23, 2019, Blanco released a song titled "Me Voy Contigo" as the follow-up single. The collaboration between Blanco and Drake Bell titled "No Perdamos Más Tiempo" was released on September 6, 2019. During the fall of 2019, Blanco opened Tini's Quiero Volver Tour concerts in Montevideo, Uruguay, and Buenos Aires, Argentina.

2021–present: Daddies on Request and new music 
On March 12, 2021, Blanco was featured on "Say O" from Brazilian DJ and producer Bruno Martini's debut album Original. On March 19, 2021, Blanco released "Polvo De Estrellas", a collaboration with DJ duo AtellaGalli, as a single. On March 26, 2021, the collaboration between Blanco and singer Anna Chase titled "Antídoto" was released as a single. On September 24, 2021, Blanco released a song titled "Hot Damn" as a single. On October 29, 2021, Blanco released a song titled "Bad Karma" as the follow-up single. Blanco voiced Noah in the Latin American version of the animated film Ron's Gone Wrong, released in October 2021. On November 5, 2021, Blanco appeared on the remix of Lalo Brito's song "La Culpa". On March 11, 2022, the collaboration between Blanco and musical group Grupo Cañaveral De Humberto Pabón titled "Dime Que Regresarás" was released as a single.

Blanco was cast in a Disney+ original series Papás por Encargo  (Daddies on Request in English) as Miguel, one of the female lead character's three adoptive fathers. The first season of the series was released on July 13, 2022. Blanco sang alongside his co-stars Michael Ronda, Lalo Brito and Farah Justiniani the series' theme song, "Vivo", which was released on June 24, 2022 to promote the show. Blanco appeared alongside some of the cast members of Violetta in a Disney+ special celebrating the show's 10th anniversary, Solo Amor y Mil Canciones, released on December 8, 2022.

Personal life 
Blanco lived in Buenos Aires, Argentina for three years while working on Violetta. Following the end of the Violetta Live musical tour and the production of Tini: The Movie, Blanco relocated to Los Angeles, United States where he resided for few years before moving back to his home country Mexico. Blanco is fluent in Spanish, English, Italian, Portuguese and French. Since 2007, Blanco has been in a relationship with actress and singer Stephie Caire, whom he had met the same year on High School Musical: La Selección. In August 2016, Blanco and Caire became engaged. In January 2021, Blanco revealed through his social media that he married Caire a few years ago.

Filmography

Discography

Extended plays

Singles

As lead artist

As featured artist

Promotional singles

Other appearances

Soundtracks 
 High School Musical: El Desafio Mexico (2008)
 Cuando toca la campana (2011)
 Violetta (2012)
 Cantar es lo que soy (2012)
 Hoy somos más (2013)
 Violetta en Vivo (2013)
 Gira mi canción (2014)
 Crecimos juntos (2015)
 Papás por encargo (2022)

Music videos

Concert tours 
 Violetta en Vivo (2013–14)
 Violetta Live (2015)
 R5 opening act, Europe (2017)
 Conmigo Tour (2019)

Awards and nominations

References

External links 
 Official website
 

1991 births
Living people
Mexican male television actors
Mexican male film actors
Mexican pop singers
Male actors from Guadalajara, Jalisco
Mexican male child actors
21st-century Mexican male singers
Mexican expatriates in Argentina
Mexican people of Spanish descent
Singers from Guadalajara, Jalisco
English-language singers from Mexico
Hollywood Records artists
21st-century Mexican male actors
Male pop singers